The Forestry Farm Park and Zoo is a forested park and zoo located in Saskatoon, Saskatchewan, Canada. The park was originally established as the Dominion Forest Nursery Station  and later Sutherland Forest Nursery Station. Between 1913 and 1966 was responsible for growing and shipping 147 million trees shipped across the northern prairie provinces.  The first shipment of trees were sent to farmers in 1916.  The park is designated a National Historic Site of Canada.  The nursery grew caragana, ash, maple, elm, and willow. After the nursery closed in 1966 a portion was re-opened as a city park.

The park contains the following areas:
 Forestry Farm House (The Superintendent's Residence) – is a historical farm house of a Georgian brink design built in 1913 located within the park. The building was officially designated a heritage property on July 3, 1990.
 Hall – With a capacity of 225 people
 Gazebo Picnic Site – With seating for up to 100 people
 Fishing Pond – A Pond stocked with Rainbow Trout (daily permit required)
 Kinsmen Express Zoo Train – Guided tour through the zoo area 
 Paws Inn Concession and Gift Shop – A Concession Stand and Gift Shop operated by the Zoo Society 
 Meditation Garden – Cared for by the Perennial Society 
 Heritage Rose Garden – Cared for by the Perennial Society 
 Zoo – The zoo facilities
 Demonstration Forest – Original demonstration forest once part of the nursery.

Developed long before any major residential development in the region, since the 1990s the park has been virtually surrounded by Saskatoon's urban sprawl, casting the Forestry Farm, along with several contiguous linear parks, in an additional role as part of the region's greenbelt.

Zoo 

The Zoo is housed within the park. In 1964 the Golden Gate Animal Farm ran into financial difficulties, the city agreed to acquire the animals and equipment; the zoo was then relocated to the park.  The Zoo is accredited by the Canadian Association of Zoos and Aquariums and contains over 80 species of animals.

The Saskatoon Regional Zoological Society was formed in 1976 to aid in the education program at the zoo and advance the care of the animals.  The society later changed its name to the Saskatoon Zoo Society.

References

External links 

 Saskatoon Zoo Society Webpage
 Saskatchewn Perennial Society

Zoos in Canada
1966 establishments in Saskatchewan
National Historic Sites in Saskatchewan
Parks in Saskatchewan
Tourist attractions in Saskatoon
Forests of Saskatchewan